Kaleh Qatar-e Olya (also Romanized as  Kaleh Qaţār-e ‘Olyā; also known as Kaleh Qaţār and Kal-e Qaţār-e ‘Olyā) is a village in Bijnavand Rural District, in the Zagros District of Chardavol County, Ilam Province, Iran. At the 2006 census, its population was 53, in 12 families. The village is populated by Kurds.

References 

Populated places in Chardavol County
Kurdish settlements in Ilam Province